Brisbane Christian College is an independent Assemblies of God Christian co-educational early learning, primary and secondary day school, located in the Brisbane suburb of , Queensland, Australia. The college was founded in 1985 under the name Southside Christian College and is a ministry of Life Church Brisbane.

Campuses 
Brisbane Christian College is a pre-prep to Year 12 college with three campuses;
 Pre-Prep Centre in Coopers Plains, Brisbane
 Primary School in Salisbury, Brisbane
The Middle and Secondary Campus is on a  site and was the previous location of Nyanda State High School (also known as Salisbury High School).

Principals 
The following individuals have served as Principal:

See also 

 List of schools in Greater Brisbane

References

External links 
 Youtube – Brisbane Christian College
 My School – Brisbane Christian College 2016 Profile

Nondenominational Christian schools in Brisbane
Private primary schools in Brisbane
Private secondary schools in Brisbane
Educational institutions established in 1985
1985 establishments in Australia